Les Nouvelles Aventures de Lucky Luke (English: The New Adventures of Lucky Luke) is a 2001–2003 animated television series based on the Franco-Belgian comic book series of the same name created by Belgian cartoonist Morris. 52 episodes were produced.

The show was directed by Olivier Jean-Marie and produced by Marc du Pontavice at the Xilam studios in Paris, France. The music for the series was composed by Ramon Pipin and Hervé Lavandier. A theatrical feature-length film directly based on the series titled Go West! A Lucky Luke Adventure was later released in 2007.

Plot
Lucky Luke is a cowboy who shoots faster than his own shadow. With the help of his faithful horse Jolly Jumper (the world's smartest horse) and sometimes also Rintindumb (the world's dumbest dog), he maintains peace and order in the Wild West. He hunts down desperadoes, keeps sharpshooters like Billy the Kid in check and constantly recaptures and returns The Daltons to prison.

Voice cast

Original French cast
 Antoine de Caunes as Lucky Luke
 Eric Legrand as Jolly Jumper, Jack and William Dalton
 Bernard Alane: Averell Dalton
 Gérard Surugue as Joe Dalton
 Francis Perrin as Rintindumb
 Isabelle Mangini as Calamity Jane
 Eric Metayer as Général Custer
 Donald Reignoux as Billy the Kid
 Marc Saez as Shérif Sleekhorn, TchinasTchin
 François Siener as Aigle Intègre, John Glutton
 Françoise Vallon as Lola Montes
 Valérie Karsenti

English cast
 Marcel Jeannin as Lucky Luke and Rintindumb 
 Mark Camacho
 Ellen David
 Sonja Ball
 John Stocker as Joe Dalton
 Arthur Holden
 Daniel Brochu
 Laura Teasdale
 Bronwen Mantel
 Pauline Little as Lotta Legs
 Rick Jones as Jack Dalton
 Terrence Scammell
 Rick Miller
 Susan Glover
 Terry Simpson
 Cathy Weseluck as Big Bone Bear
 Adrian Truss as Jolly Jumper

Episodes

Production
Ten years after the last series of Lucky Luke episodes, Xilam has launched the production of new ones. The hope for Marc du Pontavice for this series is that it has to fill in the gap between the series already aired "which have aged" the new episodes "which have not aged". Fifty-two episodes were made with a budget of 120 million francs (just over EUR 18 million). These episodes are new stories written for the series.

 Because he died in July 2001, and the show was not released until September, apart from a few rushes, Morris never viewed the series.
 The series uses the graphic process Morris used that employs colors to differentiate a character according to its value in the (foreground, background), according to his mood state (green rage, ...) or to describe a mood (red fire, night blue, ...).
Some characters are caricatures (Garcimore, Roberto Benigni, Woody Allen, ...)
 This series features new historical characters (General Custer, the Lumière brothers, Lola Montez, Buffalo Bill, John Ford, Ulysses S. Grant, Queen Victoria), or literary (Sherlock Holmes, Don Quixote).
 An error seems to have occurred in the chronology of events. In episode 47, "A Bone For The Daltons", Lucky Luke states that he knows an archaeologist who he later meets for the first time in the next episode, "The Great Nose Of Talisman".

Broadcast
In France, the show aired on France 2 and France 3, while in Canada, it was broadcast on Télé-Québec.

See also
 List of French animated television series
 List of French television series
 Lucky Luke

References

External links
 
  Les Nouvelles Aventures de Lucky Luke on Allociné
 Les Nouvelles Aventures de Lucky Luke on Planète Jeunesse

2001 French television series debuts
2003 French television series endings
2000s French animated television series
French children's animated action television series
French children's animated adventure television series
French children's animated comedy television series
2001 Canadian television series debuts
2003 Canadian television series endings
2000s Canadian animated television series
Canadian children's animated action television series
Canadian children's animated adventure television series
Canadian children's animated comedy television series
2000s Western (genre) television series
Television series set in the 19th century
Television series based on Belgian comics
Western (genre) animated television series
Lucky Luke
Xilam
France Télévisions children's television series